Barnby Dun with Kirk Sandall is a civil parish in the metropolitan borough of Doncaster, South Yorkshire, England.  The parish contains four listed buildings that are recorded in the National Heritage List for England.  Of these, one is listed at Grade I, the highest of the three grades, one is at Grade II*, the middle grade, and the others are at Grade II, the lowest grade.  The parish contains the villages of Barnby Dun and Kirk Sandall, and the surrounding area.  The listed buildings consist of two churches, a churchyard cross, and a barn and cart shed.


Key

Buildings

References

Citations

Sources

 

Lists of listed buildings in South Yorkshire
Buildings and structures in the Metropolitan Borough of Doncaster